The A77 autoroute is a motorway in central France. The road starts at the hamlet of Rosiers in Seine-et-Marne and finishes to the south of Nevers in Nièvre. It is also known as the l'Arbre - the motorway of the Tree.

It has been designed to minimise its effect on the environment. Each of the rest areas bears the name of a species.  
The road has been integrated into the landscape helped by zoologists to allow the passage of the animals (wild or cattle) from one side of the road to the other, as in the forest of Montargis.  This added to the cost of construction.

Rosiers to Cosne-Cours-sur-Loire 
The motorway is managed by the company the Paris-Rhine-Rhone (SAPRR). It is a toll road with 2x2 lanes and totals . 
 Before 1999: The A77 was formed by re-numbering an old motorway connection to the A6 autoroute. The road was the upgraded N7 to Dordives. The toll road follows the valley of the Loing. 
 1999: Opening of the Dordives - Briare section of  
 2000: Opening of the Briare - Cosne-Cours-sur-Loire section of  
 2009: Opening of the junction with the A19 autoroute.

= Junctions  
=
 Exchange A6-A77 Exchanging half between A6 and A77
 17 (Dordives) 5 km: Towns served: Dordives, Souppes-sur-Loing, Château-Landon, Ferrières-en-Gâtinais
 Exchange A19-A77 Junction with the A19 autoroute
 Rest areas: L'Hêtre Poupre/Le Sophora
 18 (Montargis) 28 km: Towns served city Montargis
 Rest areas: Le Cèdre/Le Liquidambar
 18.1 (Varennes-Changy): Towns served: Varennes-Changy
 Service Area: Jardin des Arbres     
 19 (Nogent-sur-Vernisson Gien) to 54 km: Served cities Gien and Nogent-sur-Vernisson
 Rest areas: Gingko feel Paris-Province, Tulipier feel Province-Paris
 20 (Briare) to 67 km: served city Briare
 21 (Auxerre/Saint-Fargeau) to 80 km: Towns served: Bonny-sur-Loire, Saint-Fargeau 62 km Auxerre
 Rest areas: Caule/Séquoïa 
 22 (Cosne-sur-Loire/Saint-Amand-en-Puisaye) 97 km: Towns served: Cosne-sur-Loire Saint-Amand-en-Puisaye

Cosne-sur-Loire to Nevers-South 
The motorway is managed by the département of Nièvre. It is a free motorway with 2x2 lanes.
 From 1992 to 2004: Phased opening of the section Cosne to Nevers-South

Junctions

 22.1 (Cosne-sur-Loire-centre) 99 km: Towns served: Cosne-sur-Loire
 23 (Cosne-sur-Loire-Sud) 103 km: Towns served: Cosne-sur-Loire 
 24 (Malataverne) 108 km: Towns Served: Sancerre and Saint-Laurent-l'Abbaye
 Service Area: 
 25 (Pouilly-sur-Loire-nord) 108 km: Towns served: Pouilly-sur-Loire which is located pile at the medium between the source and the mouth of the Loire Rest area of Pouilly feel Paris-Province 
 26 (Pouilly-sur-Loire-sud) 112 km: Towns served: Pouilly-sur-Loire
 Rest area: Pouilly
 27 (Mesves-sur-Loire) 117 km: Towns served: Mesves-sur-Loire
 28 (Charité-sur-Loire-nord) 119 km: Towns served: La Charité-sur-Loire
 29 (Charité-sur-Loire-Center) 122 km: Towns served: La Charité-sur-Loire
 30 (La Marche) 129 km: Towns served: La Marche
 31 (Pougues-les-Eaux Nord) 136 km: Towns served: Pougues-les-Eaux
 Rest Area: Pougues-les-Eaux
 32 (Varennes-Pougues-les-Eaux) 143 km: Towns served: Pougues-les-Eaux and Varennes-Vauzelles Z.I.
 33 (Nevers-center) 145 km: Towns served: Nevers Center, Varennes-Vauzelles, Château de la Rocherie
 34 (Nevers-sud St-Éloi) 150 km: Towns served: Nevers
 36 (Saint-Éloi) 154 km: Towns served: Saint-Éloi, Decize
 37 (Nevers-sud)) 158 km: Towns served: Nevers
 Rest area: Faience Manufacturers

Nevers to Moulins
Plans are to extend the motorway to Moulins, with sections already under construction on the existing RN7. The by-pass of Moulins and Villeneuve-sur-Allier has already been completed to autoroute standard. As of December 2022, the plans have not been completed.

External links
 A77 Motorway in Saratlas

A77